The 2014 Men's Central American and Caribbean Basketball Championship, also known as 2014 Centrobasket, was the regional basketball championship of FIBA Americas for the Central American and Caribbean subzone. The top 4 teams qualify for the 2015 FIBA Americas Championship. The tournament was held in the city of Tepic in Nayarit, Mexico from August 1 to August 7.

Participating teams 
 
 
 
 
 
 
 
 
 
 

Mexico qualified as host.

Puerto Rico, Panama, Jamaica and Dominican Republic qualified as the 4 first places in the 2012 Centrobasket

The Bahamas, U.S. Virgin Islands and Cuba qualified from the 2014 FIBA CBC Championship, which took place from July 1 to July 5 in Tortola, British Virgin Islands.  (http://www.fibaamericas.com/torneos1.asp?xtab=1&t=EYXONZZFPF)

El Salvador and Costa Rica qualified from the 2013 COCABA Championship, which took place from July 26 to July 28 in San Salvador, El Salvador.  (http://www.fibaamericas.com/torneos1.asp?xtab=1&t=ZXSEXGVNUC)

Preliminary round 
The draw for the 2014 Centrobasket Championship was held in San Juan, Puerto Rico on June 9, 2014. Ten teams were drawn into two pools with five teams in each.

Group A 

|}

Group B 

 

|}

Knockout round

Semifinals

Third place playoff

Finals

Final rankings
The top four teams qualified for the 2015 FIBA Americas Championship. With Mexico being named host, they were automatically qualified for the Championship. This meant an extra spot was open, which was given to the 5th place team, Panama.

References 

Centrobasket
2014–15 in North American basketball
2014 in Central American sport
2014 in Caribbean sport
2014 in Mexican sports
International basketball competitions hosted by Mexico
Sport in Tepic